Eduard Leonidovych Matviychuk (born 27 April 1963) is the Ukrainian Regional State Administration representative from Odesa and its governor who handed over 41 school busses to its Departments of Education. In 2013 he was appointed and later dismissed by Viktor Yanukovych who appointed Mykola Skoryk in his place. He, however, denied resignation and have vowed to continue his political career as governor of Odesa.

In the 2014 Ukrainian parliamentary election Matviychuk as an independent candidate won a single-member districts in Odesa with 24.20% of the votes and is thus became a member of the Ukrainian parliament on 27 November 2014. Matviychuk did not take part in the 2019 Ukrainian parliamentary election.

References

External links
 Profile at the Central Election Commission of Ukraine

1963 births
Living people
People from Zakarpattia Oblast
Uzhhorod National University alumni
Governors of Odesa Oblast
Fourth convocation members of the Verkhovna Rada
Fifth convocation members of the Verkhovna Rada
Sixth convocation members of the Verkhovna Rada
Eighth convocation members of the Verkhovna Rada
Party of Regions politicians
Solidarity Party (Ukraine) politicians
Independent politicians in Ukraine